The 2010 season of competitive football in Thailand.

The season will begin on 14 February 2010 for the Regional League Division 2 and 13 March 2010 for the Thai Premier League and Division 1.

Promotion and relegation (pre-season) 
Teams promoted to Thai Premier League 2010
 Police United
 Royal Thai Army
 Sisaket

Teams relegated from Thai Premier League 2009
 Sriracha
 Chula United
 Nakhon Pathom

Teams promoted to Thai Division 1 League 2010
 Raj Pracha-Nonthaburi
 Chiangrai United
 Narathiwat

Teams relegated from Thai Division 1 League 2009
 Nakhon Sawan
 Thai Airways-Ban Bueng
 Surat Thani

Managerial changes

Diary of the season
 20 February 2010: Muangthong United won the Kor Royal Cup beating Thai Port 2-0 at Suphachalasai Stadium, the match stopped in 81st minute because of the unrest.

Retirements

National team

Friendly matches

King's Cup

Asian Cup qualifiers

Deaths
17 April 2010 – Chanon Wong-arri, 32, Defender who played for PEA, TTM Samut Sakhon, Thai Port, Chula United and TOT-CAT.

Honours

 
2010